The Motorschiff Stubnitz e.V., a registered non-profit association, is the operator of an  former freeze & transport vessel of the German Democratic Republic high seas fishing fleet based in Rostock. Since 1993 it has been transformed into a mobile platform for music, cultural production, documentation and communication. Inside this listed historical monument, the former cargo holds are used as venues for live music, exhibitions, performances and media art. Artists and co-workers are lodged and fed on board.

The culture center has so far researched and presented innovative culture by touring the following European ports; 
 1994: St. Petersburg and Malmö 
 1998: Stockholm (European Capital of Culture)
 2000: Lübeck and Hamburg
 2001: Rotterdam (European Capital of Culture)
 2002: Bruges (European Capital of Culture) and Amsterdam
 2003: Szczecin and Hamburg
 2004: Riga
 2005: Copenhagen, Rotterdam, Newcastle, Amsterdam and Dunkirk
 2006: Copenhagen moored between the Black Diamond and Langebro bridge, Hamburg and Amsterdam. 
 2007: Hamburg and Amsterdam
 2008: Copenhagen, Nykøbing Falster, and Amsterdam
 2009: Stralsund, Aalborg, Copenhagen, Hamburg, Wilhelmshaven and Amsterdam
 2010: Copenhagen, Rostock, Aarhus and Hamburg
 2011: Hamburg and Rostock
 2012: Rostock, Bremen, Hamburg, Wilhelmshaven and London
 2013: London, Dunkirk (Regional Capital of Culture) and Hamburg

The main part of the maintenance and cultural work is done on a voluntary basis.

Notes

External links
 Stubnitz website
 Marinetraffic.com - with current location

Non-profit organisations based in Mecklenburg-Western Pomerania
Merchant ships of East Germany
Merchant ships of Germany
Cultural organisations based in Germany
1964 ships
Museum ships in Germany